Beach sunflower may refer to the following plant species:

Helianthus debilis, native to the United States
Melanthera biflora